Chieko Sugawara (born 15 August 1976) is a Japanese fencer. She represented Japan and competed in the women's individual foil events at the 2004, 2008 and 2012 Summer Olympics.

References

External links
 

1976 births
Living people
Japanese female foil fencers
Olympic fencers of Japan
Fencers at the 2004 Summer Olympics
Fencers at the 2008 Summer Olympics
Fencers at the 2012 Summer Olympics
Asian Games medalists in fencing
People from Kesennuma, Miyagi
Fencers at the 2002 Asian Games
Fencers at the 2006 Asian Games
Asian Games bronze medalists for Japan
Medalists at the 2002 Asian Games
Medalists at the 2006 Asian Games
21st-century Japanese women